The Arkansas River Trail is a rail trail that runs  in along both sides of the Arkansas River in Central Arkansas.

History
The Arkansas River Trail began with funding from a $1.9 million bond issue from the city of Little Rock in 2003. The trail includes a portion of the Little Rock & Western Railway. The former railbed is still in use by the railroad and operates adjacent to the trail.

Bridges

Junction and Clinton Presidential Park Bridges
Both former railroad bridges have been converted into pedestrian and bicycling bridges. The Junction Bridge opened in May 2008; the Clinton Presidential Park Bridge, named after former U.S. president Bill Clinton, opened in October 2011. Both connect the two cities' riverfront parks. The Junction Bridge is accessed via stairs and elevators.

Renovation work on the Clinton Presidential Park Bridge began in May 2010. The railroad bridge, originally constructed in 1899 as the Rock Island Bridge, is the eastern pedestrian and bicycle connection for the River Trail.

Renovation work on the Clinton Presidential Park Bridge cost $10.5 million and was funded by a mix of funds including $4 million from the Clinton Foundation, $2.5 million of federal stimulus money, $2 million from the Commerce Department, $1 million from the city of Little Rock, and $750,000 from the city of North Little Rock.

Big Dam Bridge
At 4,226 feet long, the Big Dam Bridge is the longest pedestrian and bicycle bridge in North America which was built specifically for that use. It connects Little Rock with North Little Rock.

Baring Cross
Of the three railroad spans in the downtown area one is still in use by the Union Pacific Railroad (UP). UP gave tentative approval to build a small bridge near the Little Rock Amtrak station.

References

External links
Arkansas River Trail maps, events, businesses, services, and more
The Arkansas River Trail Page on Traillink.com
American Trails web page on the Arkansas River Trail

Rail trails in Arkansas
State parks of Arkansas
Transportation in Pulaski County, Arkansas
Protected areas of Pulaski County, Arkansas
Geography of Little Rock, Arkansas
2003 establishments in Arkansas